Hadira Union is a union of Gopalpur Upazila, Tangail District, Bangladesh. It is situated at 56 km north of Tangail.

Demographics

According to Population Census 2011 performed by Bangladesh Bureau of Statistics, The total population of Hadira union is 32551. There are 8036 households in total.

Education

The literacy rate of Hadira Union is 46.6% (Male-49.2%, Female-44.1%).

See also
 Union Councils of Tangail District

References

Populated places in Dhaka Division
Populated places in Tangail District
Unions of Gopalpur Upazila